Verrucaditha is a monotypic genus of pseudoscorpions in the family Tridenchthoniidae. Its sole described species is Verrucaditha spinosa.

References

Further reading

External links

 

Tridenchthoniidae
Pseudoscorpion genera

Monotypic arachnid genera